Below is a list of foreign visits made by Queen Victoria during her reign (which lasted from 1837 until 1901), giving the names of the places she stayed and any known reasons for her visit.

Despite being head of the British Empire, which included territory on all inhabited continents, Queen Victoria never travelled outside of Europe, only travelling as far north as Golspie, southwesterly as San Sebastián, southeasterly as Florence and as far easterly as Berlin.  The majority of her visits were made to the duchies and kingdoms of Germany (often via Belgium or the Netherlands) which was the home of many members of her family and the birthplace of her husband, Albert. She also made a few official visits to France and frequently holidayed there towards the end of her life and reign, once including a brief crossing into northern Spain. She also holidayed a few times in Italy and once in Switzerland.  During their married life, the couple tended to make foreign trips in late summer, however from the 1870s, the widowed queen travelled during the spring.

1840s

1850s

1860s

1870s

1880s

1890s

References

Sources
Queen Victoria's Journals

19th century in the United Kingdom
Foreign visits
Diplomatic visits by British monarchs
Royal visits
United Kingdom history-related lists
Victoria
Personal timelines
19th century-related lists
19th century in international relations
Victoria